The 5th Cannes Film Festival was held from 23 April to 10 May 1952. As in the previous three festivals, the entire jury of this festival was made up of French persons, with Maurice Genevoix as the Jury President.  The Grand Prix of the Festival went to the Two Cents Worth of Hope by Renato Castellani and Othello by Orson Welles. The festival opened with An American in Paris by Vincente Minnelli.

Jury
The following people were appointed as the Jury of the competition:
Maurice Genevoix Jury President
André Lang (journalist)
Chapelain-Midy (artist)
Charles Vildrac (writer)
Evrard De Rouvre (producer)
Gabrielle Dorziat (actress)
Georges Raguis (union official)
Guy Desson (MP official)
Jacques-Pierre Frogerais (producer)
Jean Dréville (director)
Jean Mineur (CNCF official)
Louis Chauvet (journalist)
Madame Georges Bidault
Pierre Billon (director)
Raymond Queneau (poet, writer)
Tony Aubin (composer)

Feature film competition
The following feature films competed for the Grand Prix:

The Absentee (La Ausente) by Julio Bracho
An American in Paris by Vincente Minnelli
Ascent to Heaven (Subida al cielo) by Luis Buñuel
Cops and Robbers (Guardie e ladri) by Mario Monicelli and Steno
Cry, the Beloved Country by Zoltán Korda
Dead City (Nekri politeia) by Frixos Iliadis
Desires (Das Letzte Rezept) by Rolf Hansen
Detective Story by William Wyler
A Devil of a Woman (Der Weibsteufel) by Wolfgang Liebeneiner
Emergency Landing (Nødlanding) by Arne Skouen
Encore by Harold French, Pat Jackson and Anthony Pelissier
The Evil Forest (Parsifal) by Daniel Mangrané and Carlos Serrano de Osma
Fanfan la Tulipe by Christian-Jaque
Furrows (Surcos) by José Antonio Nieves Conde
The Immortal Song (Amar Bhoopali) by V. Shantaram
María Morena by José María Forqué and Pedro Lazaga
Man in the Storm (Arashi no naka no haha) by Kiyoshi Saeki
The Medium by Gian Carlo Menotti
Nami by Noboru Nakamura
A Night of Love (Lailat gharam) by Ahmed Badrakhan
No Greater Love (Herz der Welt) by Harald Braun
One Summer of Happiness (Hon dansade en sommar) by Arne Mattsson
Othello by Orson Welles
The Overcoat (Il Cappotto) by Alberto Lattuada
Pasó en mi barrio by Mario Soffici
The Smugglers' Banquet (Le Banquet des fraudeurs) by Henri Storck
Son of the Nile (Ibn el-Nil) by Youssef Chahine
The Tale of Genji (Genji monogatari) by Kōzaburō Yoshimura
Three Women (Trois femmes) by André Michel
Tico-Tico no Fubá by Adolfo Celi
Two Cents Worth of Hope (Due soldi di speranza) by Renato Castellani
Umberto D. by Vittorio De Sica
Under the Thousand Lanterns (Unter den tausend Laternen) by Erich Engel
Viva Zapata! by Elia Kazan
We Are All Murderers (Nous sommes tous des assassins) by André Cayatte

Out of competition
The following film was selected to be screened out of competition:
The Crimson Curtain (Le Rideau cramoisi) by Alexandre Astruc

Short film competition

 Les ailes de Ariel by Gaetano De Maria
 Animated Genesis by Peter Foldes, Joan Foldes
 Aperçus Sud Africain N° 5 - Afrique Préhistorique by Errol Hinds
 Apollon Musageta by Irène Dodall
 L'Art Sacre Missionnaire by Gentil Marques
 Aux frontières Yougoslaves by Djordie Vukotic
 Bambini by Francesco Maselli
 Cairo by Massimo Dallamano
 Les charmes des détails dans les tableaux des maîtres d'autrefois by Dr. Hans Curlis
 Le cordonnier et le chapelier by John Halas
 Dans les royaumes de la mer by Giovanni Roccardi
 Démonstration en matière de perception by Garett I. Johnson
 Les deux mousquetaires by William Hanna, Joseph Barbera
 Diagnostiquer et guérir by Ernest Bingen
 Djerba l'île biblique by Philippe Este
 El Dorado by John Alderson (filmmaker)
 Et la noce dansait by Yehoshua Bertonov
 Indian Village (Indisk by) by Arne Sucksdorff
 Le flottage du bois by Lee Prater, Dick Mosher
 La fugue de Mahmoud by Roger Leenhardt
 Les gens du nord by René Lucot
 La gloire verte by M. Ahmed
 Le grand Boudha by Noburo Ofuji
 La grande île au cœur des Saintes Eaux by Monique Muntcho, J.K. Raymond-Millet
 La grande passion by Alphonse Stummer
 Groenland : Vingt mille lieux sur les glaces by Marcel Ichac, Jean-Jacques Languepin
 L'homme dans la tour by Bernard Devlin, Jean Palardy
 Inside Newfoundland (Terre neuve) by Sydney Newman
 T Schot is te boord! by Herman van der Horst
 Les joies rustiques by V.R. Sarma
 Le jour de l'independance by Victor Vicas
 Le jour promis by S.I. Shweig
 Maskerage by Max De Haas
 Masques et visages de James Ensor by Paul Haesaerts
 Moines de l'ordre de la Merci by Christian Anwander
 Paysans de l'Aures by Philippe Este
 La peinture de Boldini by Gian Luigi Rondi
 Quarante ans d'évolution Marocaine - présence Française au Maroc by Serge Debecque
 Rythmes de Rotterdam by Ytzen Brusse
 Six mille ans de civilisation by Ahmed Korshid
 Story of Steel by Jagat Murari
 Strasbourg européenne by Ernest Bingen
 Panta Rhei by Bert Haanstra
 Union infernale by Ulrich Kayser
 Victor Hugo by Roger Leenhardt & Yvonne Gerber
 La vie des fresques by Zoran Markus
 Vieux temples, vieilles statues by Sôya Mizuki

Awards

Official awards
The following films and people received the 1952 awards:
Feature Films
Grand Prix 
Two Cents Worth of Hope (Due soldi di speranza) by Renato Castellani
Othello by Orson Welles
Best Director: Christian-Jaque for Fanfan la Tulipe
Best Screenplay: Piero Tellini for Cops and Robbers (Guardie e ladri)
Best Actress: Lee Grant for Detective Story
Best Actor: Marlon Brando for Viva Zapata!
Best Cinematography: The Tale of Genji (Genji monogatari) by Kōzaburō Yoshimura (Prix de la photographie et de la composition plastique)
Best Music: Sven Sköld for One Summer of Happiness (Hon dansade en sommar)
Jury Special Prize: We Are All Murderers (Nous sommes tous des assassins) by André Cayatte
Best Lyrical Film: The Medium by Gian Carlo Menotti
Short films
Grand Prix: T Schot is te boord! by Herman van der Horst
Prix spécial du Jury: Indian Village (Indisk by) by Arne Sucksdorff
Prix pour la couleur: Animated Genesis by Peter Foldes, Joan Foldes
Prix spécial du Jury - film scientifique ou pédagogique: Groenland : Vingt mille lieux sur les glaces by Marcel Ichac, Jean-Jacques Languepin

Independent awards
OCIC Award
 Two Cents Worth of Hope by Renato Castellani
 Special Mention: La Vie de Jésus by Marcel Gibaud

References

Media
Institut National de l'Audiovisuel: Opening of the 1952 Festival (commentary in French)
INA: List of award-winners at the 1952 Cannes Festival (commentary in French)

External links 
1952 Cannes Film Festival (web.archive)
Official website Retrospective 1952 
Cannes Film Festival Awards for 1952 at Internet Movie Database

Cannes Film Festival, 1952
Cannes Film Festival, 1952
Cannes Film Festival